Vincenzo Napoli may refer to:

Vincenzo Napoli (bishop) (1574-1648), Italian Roman Catholic bishop
Vincenzo Napoli (politician) (born 1950), Italian politician